Liu Anwu (12 July 1930 – 9 August 2018) was a Chinese translator who is the honorary president of China Indian Literature Research Association. Liu also a professor in Indian literature at Peking University, Nanjing Institute of International Relations and Shenzhen University.

He was one of the main translators of the works of the Indian novelist and poet Rabindranath Tagore into Chinese.

Biography
Liu was born in Changde, Hunan in July 1930. Liu attended Changde County School in 1943. Liu secondary studied at the Hunan Provincial No.4 High School. Liu entered Hunan University in 1949, majoring in Chinese language, he was accepted to Peking University in 1951, where he majored in Hindi language.

In 1954, Liu was sent abroad to study at the expense of the government, he studied at Delhi University and Banaras Hindu University.

Liu returned to China in 1958, then he taught at Peking University.

Liu started to publish works in 1980 and he joined the China Writers Association in 1988.

Liu retired in 2000.

Translation
 The Complete Works of Tagore (Rabindranath Tagore)
 Newly married
 Pleasant Tree
 The Woman of Mowing
 Selected Short Stories of Munshi Premchand (Munshi Premchand)

Works
 History of Indian Hindi Literature
 Critical Biography of Munshi Premchand
 Indian Literature and Chinese Literature

Awards
 Chinese Translation Association – Competent Translator (2004)

References

1930 births
People from Changde
Hunan University alumni
Peking University alumni
People's Republic of China translators
Delhi University alumni
Banaras Hindu University alumni
Hindi–Chinese translators
English–Chinese translators
2018 deaths
20th-century Chinese translators
21st-century Chinese translators